Ivano Della Morte (born 13 October 1974 in Cirié, Piedmont) is an Italian association football former player, and currently a manager. He played 28 Serie A matches, 154 Serie B, 72 in Serie C1, and retired in 2007 after a seasonal stint with Serie D outfit Alessandria. In 2007, he started working to take his coaching badges, and in 2008 he coached Piedmontese Eccellenza club Borgaro (based in Borgaro Torinese).

External links
 AlessandriaCalcio.it

1974 births
Living people
People from Cirié
Italian footballers
Italy under-21 international footballers
Italy youth international footballers
Torino F.C. players
A.C. Monza players
U.S. Lecce players
U.S. Avellino 1912 players
U.S. Alessandria Calcio 1912 players
A.C. Reggiana 1919 players
S.S. Fidelis Andria 1928 players
S.S.D. Lucchese 1905 players
L.R. Vicenza players
A.C. ChievoVerona players
Genoa C.F.C. players
A.C. Cesena players
Ascoli Calcio 1898 F.C. players
Serie A players
Serie B players
Serie C players
Serie D players
Association football midfielders
Footballers from Piedmont
Sportspeople from the Metropolitan City of Turin